Eurycallinus mirabilis is a species of Longhorn beetle described by Henry Walter Bates in 1885.

References

Beetles described in 1885
Phacellini